John Joseph Vincent Kessel (born September 24, 1950) is an American author of science fiction and fantasy. He is a prolific short story writer, and the author of four solo novels, Good News From Outer Space (1989), Corrupting Dr. Nice (1997), The Moon and the Other (2017), and Pride and Prometheus (2018), and one novel, Freedom Beach (1985) in collaboration with his friend James Patrick Kelly. Kessel is married to author Therese Anne Fowler.

Education

Kessel obtained a B.A. in Physics and English from the University of Rochester in 1972, followed by a M.A. in English from University of Kansas in 1974, and a Ph.D. in English from the University of Kansas in 1981, where he studied under science fiction writer and scholar James Gunn. Since 1982 Kessel has taught classes in American literature, science fiction, fantasy, and fiction writing at North Carolina State University, and helped organize the MFA Creative Writing program at NCSU, serving as its first director.

Publications

Kessel won a Nebula Award in 1982 for his novella "Another Orphan", in which the protagonist finds himself living inside the novel Moby-Dick, and a second for his 2008 novelette "Pride and Prometheus", a story melding the tales of Jane Austen's Pride and Prejudice and Mary Shelley's Frankenstein. This novelette also won a 2009 Shirley Jackson Award. The intervening 26 years was the longest gap between competitive awards in Nebula history. His short story "Buffalo" won the Theodore Sturgeon Memorial Award and the Locus poll in 1992.

His novella "Stories for Men" shared the 2002 James Tiptree, Jr. Award for science fiction dealing with gender issues with M. John Harrison's novel Light.  He has been nominated three times for a World Fantasy Award: 1993 for the Meeting in Infinity collection, 1999 for the short fiction "Every Angel is Terrifying", and 2009 for the short story "Pride and Prometheus".

Kessel is also a widely published science fiction and fantasy critic.  His works of criticism include the 2004 essay on Orson Scott Card's novel Ender's Game, "Creating the Innocent Killer: Ender's Game, Intention, and Morality".  With Mark L. Van Name, Kessel created the Sycamore Hill Writer's Workshop. Kessel has also edited, with Kelly, three collections of contemporary sf short stories, Feeling Very Strange: The Slipstream Anthology, Rewired: The Post-Cyberpunk Anthology, and The Secret History of Science Fiction.

In 1994 his play Faustfeathers received the Paul Green Playwrights' Prize. In 2007 his story "A Clean Escape" (previously adapted by Kessel as a one-act play in 1986) was adapted by Sam Egan for ABC's science fiction anthology series Masters of Science Fiction.

Bibliography

Novels
 1985 Freedom Beach (with James Patrick Kelly)
 1989 Good News From Outer Space (Nebula Award Nominee)
 1997 Corrupting Dr. Nice
 2017 The Moon and the Other
 2018 Pride and Prometheus

Short fiction 
Collections
 1992 Meeting in Infinity (World Fantasy Award Nominee)
 1997 The Pure Product
 2008 The Baum Plan for Financial Independence and Other Stories
Stories

 1988 "Mrs. Shummel Exits a Winner" (June, Asimov's SF) - Nebula Award Nominee
 1991 "Buffalo" (January, Fantasy and Science Fiction) - Sturgeon Award Winner, Locus Award Winner, Hugo Award Nominee, Nebula Award Nominee
 1993 "The Franchise" (August, Asimov's SF) - Nebula Award nominee, Hugo Award nominee, novelette
 1996 "The Miracle of Ivar Avenue" (from Intersections) - Nebula Award nominee, novelette
 1998 "Every Angel is Terrifying" (October–November, Fantasy and Science Fiction) - World Fantasy Award nominee
 1999 "Ninety Percent of Everything" with Jonathan Lethem and James Patrick Kelly (September, Fantasy and Science Fiction) - Nebula Award nominee, novella
 2002 "Stories for Men" (October–November, Asimov's SF) - James Tiptree, Jr. Award Winner, Nebula Award Nominee

Anthologies and collections (edited) 
 1996 Intersections: The Sycamore Hill Anthology (with Mark L. Van Name and Richard Butner)
 1998 Memory's Tailor (by Laurence Rudner. Kessel was the literary executor after Rudner's death in 1995.)
 2006 Feeling Very Strange: The Slipstream Anthology (with James Patrick Kelly) Features stories by Aimee Bender, Michael Chabon, Ted Chiang, Carol Emshwiller, Jeffrey Ford, Karen Joy Fowler, Theodora Goss, Jonathan Lethem, Kelly Link, M. Rickert, Benjamin Rosenbaum, George Saunders, Bruce Sterling, Jeff VanderMeer, and Howard Waldrop
 2007 Rewired: The Post-Cyberpunk Anthology (coedited with James Patrick Kelly) (Tachyon Publications)
 2009 The Secret History of Science Fiction (coedited with James Patrick Kelly) (Tachyon Publications)
 2011 Kafkaesque: Stories Inspired by Franz Kafka (coedited with James Patrick Kelly) (Tachyon Publications)
 2012 Nebula Awards Showcase 2012 (coedited with James Patrick Kelly (Pyr)
 2012 Digital Rapture: The Singularity Anthology (coedited with James Patrick Kelly (Tachyon Publications)

Plays
 1986 A Clean Escape
 1994 Faustfeathers (Paul Green Playwrights' Prize Winner)

Book reviews

References

External links
 John Kessel's home page
 
 John Kessel Papers, MS 358 at the Kenneth Spencer Research Library, University of Kansas
 Guide to the John Kessel Collection of Science Fiction Magazines 1951-2011
 An Interview with John Kessel and James Patrick Kelly conducted by John Joseph Adams
An interview with John Kessel conducted by Fiona Kelleghan writing as Ellen Feehan
 Free download of The Baum Plan for Financial Independence from the publisher

 Talk: "The Future as Mirror: How SF Uses the Tomorrow to Understand Today" - Fractal'11 conference
 A July 2017 podcast with John Kessel conducted by David Barr Kirtley 
 A July 2017 podcast with John Kessel conducted by Scott Edelman

1950 births
Living people
20th-century American dramatists and playwrights
20th-century American male writers
20th-century American novelists
20th-century American poets
20th-century American short story writers
American male dramatists and playwrights
American male novelists
American male poets
American male short story writers
American science fiction writers
The Magazine of Fantasy & Science Fiction people
Nebula Award winners
North Carolina State University faculty
Novelists from New York (state)
Novelists from North Carolina
Writers from Buffalo, New York